Blount County Schools (BCS) is a school district in Blount County, Tennessee, United States.  The district has 18 schools with 750 teachers/administrators serving approximately 11,000 students.

The district includes all unincorporated areas and all municipalities except for Maryville and most of Alcoa.

Communities in the district boundary include: Eagleton Village, Friendsville, Greenback, Happy Valley, Louisville, Rockford, Seymour, Tallassee, Townsend, Walland & Wildwood.

History
In 2022 the board of trustees made David Murrell the director (superintendent) of the school system.

Schools
Below is a list of schools in the system, grouped by high school and feeder schools, followed by the year built, mascot and enrollment figures.

Heritage High School, 1,693 (Mountaineers) 1977 
Eagleton Middle School 437 (Royals) 2002
Eagleton Elementary 515 (Ravens) 1962
Rockford Elementary 382 (Tigers) 1919
Heritage Middle School 708 (Mustangs) 1991 
Montvale Elementary 558 (Knights) 1984 
Porter Elementary 665 (Panthers) 1806/1918 
Prospect Elementary 425 (Cubs) 2011
Townsend Elementary 131 (Tigers) 1993 
Walland Elementary 346 (Indians) 1963
William Blount High School, 1,612 (Governors)  1979
Carpenters Middle School 814 (Cougars) 2001
Carpenters Elementary 261 (Cougars) 2006
Fairview Elementary 412 (Angels) 1952
Lanier Elementary 617 (Eagles) 1922
Union Grove Middle School (Wildcats) 2008
Friendsville Elementary 492 (Falcons) 1919
Mary Blount Elementary 606 (Bears) 1989
Middlesettlements Elementary 378 (Settlers) 1981
Union Grove Elementary 369 (Bobcats) 2008

Schools Proposed or Under Construction
High School (to relieve overcrowding at William Blount High School)

Throughout the 1980s, the school system undertook a programme of school consolidation, particularly for elementary schools. The result was larger, more comprehensive schools. The consolidation led to the closing of several smaller and community schools.
Former Schools
Alnwick School
Binfield School
Bungalow School
Chilhowee View School
Forest Hill School
Hubbard School
Louisville School
Mentor School
Rush Strong School
Rocky Branch Elementary
Union Elementary

See also
List of high schools in Tennessee

References

External links
 

School districts in Tennessee
Education in Blount County, Tennessee